Romain Grange (born 21 July 1988) is a French professional footballer who plays as a winger for Championnat National club Châteauroux.

Club career
Born in Châteauroux, Grange started his career with hometown team LB Châteauroux in 2008, making his debut as a substitute for Rudy Haddad in the 1–0 win over Boulogne on 13 March 2009. He spent four seasons with the club, making almost 100 appearances in all competitions.

In May 2012, he agreed a three-year contract with Ligue 1 side AS Nancy. He went on to play 54 league matches for the club, scoring five goals.

At the end of his contract, Grange joined newly promoted Ligue 2 outfit Paris FC on a free transfer. While Paris were relegated at the end of the 2015–16 season, he ended the campaign as the club's top goalscorer with 6 goals in 30 appearances.

On 8 June 2016, Grange signed a three-year contract with Chamois Niortais, where he was reunited with former Paris manager Denis Renaud.

In January 2017, he moved to Belgium, signing a 2.5-year contract with the option of a further year with Belgian First Division A Charleroi.

Career statistics

References

External links

1988 births
Living people
People from Châteauroux
Sportspeople from Indre
Association football midfielders
French footballers
French expatriate footballers
LB Châteauroux players
AS Nancy Lorraine players
Paris FC players
Chamois Niortais F.C. players
R. Charleroi S.C. players
Grenoble Foot 38 players
Ligue 1 players
Ligue 2 players
Championnat National 2 players
Championnat National 3 players
Belgian Pro League players
French expatriate sportspeople in Belgium
Expatriate footballers in Belgium
Footballers from Centre-Val de Loire